The Italic peoples were an ethnolinguistic group identified by their use of Italic languages, a branch of the Indo-European language family.

The Italic peoples are descended from the Indo-European speaking peoples who inhabited Italy from at least the second millennium BC onwards. Latins achieved a dominant position among these tribes, establishing ancient Roman civilization. During this development, other Italic tribes adopted Latin language and culture in a process known as Romanization. This process was eventually extended to certain parts of Europe. The ethnic groups which emerged as a result are known as Romance peoples.

Classification

The Italics were an ethnolinguistic group who are identified by their use of the Italic languages, which form one of the branches of Indo-European languages.

Outside of the specialised linguistic literature, the term is also used to describe the ancient peoples of Italy as defined in Roman times, including pre-Roman peoples like the Etruscans and the Raetians, who did not speak Indo-European languages. Such use is improper in linguistics, but employed by sources such as the Encyclopædia Britannica, which contends that «Italy attained a unified ethnolinguistic, political, and cultural physiognomy only after the Roman conquest, yet its most ancient peoples remain anchored in the names of the regions of Roman Italy — Latium, Campania, Apulia, Bruttium, Lucania, Emilia Romagna, Samnium, Picenum, Umbria, Etruria, Venetia, and Liguria».

History

Copper Age

During the Copper Age, at the same time that metalworking appeared, Indo-European speaking peoples are believed to have migrated to Italy in several waves. Associated with this migration are the Remedello culture and Rinaldone culture in Northern and Central Italy, and the Gaudo culture of Southern Italy. These cultures were led by a warrior-aristocracy and are considered intrusive. Their Indo-European character is suggested by the presence of weapons in burials, the appearance of the horse in Italy at this time and material similarities with cultures of Central Europe.

Early and Middle Bronze Age

According to David W. Anthony, between 3100 and 3000 BC, a massive migration of Proto-Indo-Europeans from the Yamnaya culture took place into the Danube Valley. Thousands of kurgans are attributed to this event. These migrations probably split off Pre-Italic, Pre-Celtic and Pre-Germanic from Proto-Indo-European. By this time the Anatolian peoples and the Tocharians had already split off from other Indo-Europeans. Hydronymy shows that the Proto-Germanic homeland was in Central Germany, which would be very close to the homeland of Italic and Celtic languages as well. The origin of a hypothetical ancestral "Italo-Celtic" people is to be found in today's eastern Hungary, settled around 3100 BC by the Yamnaya culture. This hypothesis is to some extent supported by the observation that Italic shares a large number of isoglosses and lexical terms with Celtic and Germanic, some of which are more likely to be attributed to the Bronze Age. In particular, using Bayesian phylogenetic methods, Russell Gray and Quentin Atkinson argued that Proto-Italic speakers separated from Proto-Germanics 5500 years before present, i.e. roughly at the start of the Bronze Age. This is further confirmed by the fact that the Germanic language family shares more vocabulary with the Italic family than with the Celtic language family.

From the late third to the early second millennium BC, tribes coming both from the north and from Franco-Iberia brought the Beaker culture and the use of bronze smithing, to the Po Valley, to Tuscany and to the coasts of Sardinia and Sicily. The Beakers could have been the link which brought the Yamnaya dialects from Hungary to Austria and Bavaria. These dialects might then have developed into Proto-Celtic. The arrival of Indo-Europeans into Italy is in some sources ascribed to the Beakers. A migration across the Alps from East-Central Europe by early Indo-Europeans is thought to have occurred around 1800 BC. According to Barfield the appearance of Polada culture is connected to the movement of new populations coming from southern Germany and from Switzerland. According to Bernard Sergent, the origin of the Ligurian linguistic family (in his opinion distantly related to the Celtic and Italic ones) would have to be found in the Polada and Rhone cultures, southern branches of the Unetice culture. These individuals settled in the foothills of the Eastern Alps and present a material culture similar to contemporary cultures of Switzerland, Southern Germany, and Austria.  

In the mid-second millennium BCE, the Terramare culture developed in the Po Valley. The Terramare culture takes its name from the black earth (terra marna) residue of settlement mounds, which have long served the fertilizing needs of local farmers. These people were still hunters, but had domesticated animals; they were fairly skillful metallurgists, casting bronze in moulds of stone and clay, and they were also agriculturists, cultivating beans, the vine, wheat and flax. The Latino-Faliscan people have been associated with this culture, especially by the archaeologist Luigi Pigorini.

Late Bronze Age

The Urnfield culture might have brought proto-Italic people from among the "Italo-Celtic" tribes who remained in Hungary into Italy. These tribes are thought to have penetrated Italy from the east during the late second millennium BC through the Proto-Villanovan culture. They later crossed the Apennine Mountains and settled central Italy, including Latium. Before 1000 BC several Italic tribes had probably entered Italy. These divided into various groups and gradually came to occupy central Italy and southern Italy. This period was characterized by widespread upheaval in the Mediterranean, including the emergence of the Sea Peoples and the Late Bronze Age collapse.

The Proto-Villanovan culture dominated the peninsula and replaced the preceding Apennine culture. The Proto-Villanovans practiced cremation and buried the ashes of their dead in Urnfield-style double-cone shaped funerary urns, often decorated with geometric designs. Elite graves containing jewellery, bronze armour and horse harness fittings were separated from ordinary graves, showing for the first time the development of a highly hierarchical society, so characteristic of Indo-European cultures. The burial characteristics relate the Proto-Villanovan culture to the Central European Urnfield culture and Celtic Hallstatt culture that succeeded it. It is not possible to tell these apart in their earlier stages. Generally speaking, Proto-Villanovan settlements have been found in almost the whole Italian peninsula from Veneto to eastern Sicily, although they were most numerous in the northern-central part of Italy. The most important settlements excavated are those of Frattesina in Veneto region, Bismantova in Emilia-Romagna and near the Monti della Tolfa, north of Rome. Various authors, such as Marija Gimbutas, associated this culture with the arrival, or the spread, of the proto-Italics into the Italian peninsula.

In the 13th century BC, Proto-Celts (probably the ancestors of the Lepontii people), coming from the area of modern-day Switzerland, eastern France and south-western Germany (RSFO Urnfield group), entered Northern Italy (Lombardy and eastern Piedmont), starting the Canegrate culture, who not long time after, merging with the indigenous Ligurians, produced the mixed Golasecca culture.

Iron Age

In the early Iron Age, the relatively homogeneous Proto-Villanovan culture (1200-900 BC), closely associated with the Celtic Halstatt culture of Alpine Austria, characterised by the introduction of iron-working and the practice of cremation coupled with the burial of ashes in distinctive pottery, shows a process of fragmentation and regionalisation. In Tuscany and in part of Emilia-Romagna, Latium and Campania, the Proto-Villanovan culture was followed by the Villanovan culture. The earliest remains of Villanovan culture date back to circa 900 BC.

In the region south of the Tiber (Latium Vetus), the Latial culture of the Latins emerged, while in the north-east of the peninsula the Este culture of the Veneti appeared. Roughly in the same period, from their core area in central Italy (modern-day Umbria and Sabina region), the Osco-Umbrians began to emigrate in various waves, through the process of Ver sacrum, the ritualized extension of colonies, in southern Latium, Molise and the whole southern half of the peninsula, replacing the previous tribes, such as the Opici and the Oenotrians. This corresponds with the emergence of the Terni culture, which had strong similarities with the Celtic cultures of Hallstatt and La Tène. The Umbrian necropolis of Terni, which dates back to the 10th century BC, was identical in every aspect to the Celtic necropolis of the Golasecca culture.

Antiquity
By the mid-first millennium BC, the Latins of Rome were growing in power and influence. This led to the establishment of ancient Roman civilization. In order to combat the non-Italic Etruscans, several Italic tribes united in the Latin League. After the Latins had liberated themselves from Etruscan rule they acquired a dominant position among the Italic tribes. Frequent conflict between various Italic tribes followed. The best documented of these are the wars between the Latins and the Samnites.

The Latins eventually succeeded in unifying the Italic elements in the country. Many non-Latin Italic tribes adopted Latin culture and acquired Roman citizenship. During this time Italic colonies were established throughout the country, and non-Italic elements eventually adopted the Latin language and culture in a process known as Romanization. In the early first century BC, several Italic tribes, in particular the Marsi and the Samnites, rebelled against Roman rule. This conflict is called the Social War. After Roman victory was secured, all peoples in Italy, except for the Celts of the Po Valley, were granted Roman citizenship.

In the subsequent centuries, Italic tribes were assimilated into Latin culture in a process known as Romanization.

Genetics

A genetic study published in Science in November 2019 examined the remains of six Latin males buried near Rome between 900 BC and 200 BC. They carried the paternal haplogroups R-M269, R-311, R-PF7589 and R-P312 and the maternal haplogroups H1aj1a, T2c1f, H2a, U4a1a, H11a and H10. A female from the preceding Proto-Villanovan culture carried the maternal haplogroups U5a2b. These examined individuals were distinguished from preceding populations of Italy by the presence of ca. 25-35% steppe ancestry. Overall, the genetic differentiation between the Latins, Etruscans and the preceding proto-villanovan population of Italy was found to be insignificant.

See also 
 List of ancient Italic peoples
 Romance-speaking world
 Legacy of the Roman Empire
 Pan-Latinism

References

Sources

Further reading
M. Aberson, R. Wachter, «Ombriens, Sabins, Picéniens, peuples sabelliques des Abruzzes : une enquête historique, épigraphique et linguistique", in : Entre archéologie et Histoire : dialogues sur divers peuples de l’Italie préromaine, Bern, etc., 2014, p. 167-201.

 
Indo-European peoples